Opensignal is an independent analytics company specialising in "quantifying the mobile-network experience".

In August 2014, Opensignal raised a $4 million Series A investment from Qualcomm Ventures, OATV and Passion Capital.

Products and services 

The OpenSignal application points the user in the direction of better phone signal, measures signal strength, data speed and reliability, and displays nearby Wi-Fi networks. Users of the app share information with Opensignal, which is used in their independent maps of carrier coverage and NetworkRank service. As of July 2021 the app has been downloaded over 10 million times.

Opensignal NetworkRank is an in-app service comparing the performance of different cellular carriers in particular regions. The service is a part of their carrier maps, which are colour-coded to show areas of strong and weak cell phone signal.  The information used is provided by users of the Opensignal application.

The company produce regular industry and consumer reports based on information crowdsourced from their app users. They have worked with the BBC  and TV 2 (Denmark) to create interactive maps of 3G 'notspots' in the UK and Denmark and have also produced general reports, on topics as diverse as how cell phone screen size affects data use  to the state of "Android Fragmentation" — that is, the vast array of different types of Android devices in use; some models having very few users.

In May 2013 the firm released a second crowdsourcing app on Android, WeatherSignal. It makes use of native sensors on the phones, such as barometers, hygrometers, thermometers, magnetometers and lux-meters, to collect information sent in real-time to create live weather maps. After one week over 2 million readings had been collected.  After iPhone 6 included a barometer,  a version of the app for iPhone was released.

CrisisSignal is an Android app  to identify the status of communication networks (and outages) in emergency response areas. The interface is a real-time dashboard of signal strength, available networks, and other metrics. It has been used to assist with the relief efforts in Ebola affected regions.

Using the data collected from the Opensignal app, the company is building WifiMapper, an app for finding free Wi‑Fi hotspots,  available on iOS and Android.

Method of operation 
Mobile operators use different methods when it comes to compiling their coverage maps, Opensignal standardises this process by using  crowdsourced signal data from their users to measure the true state of carrier coverage. By crowdsourcing from client devices, the firm can build a picture of the network as it is experienced by its users, rather than modelling coverage using drive testing.

References 

Android (operating system) software
Crowdsourcing
IOS software